Paraivongius ruandicus is a species of leaf beetle. It is distributed in Rwanda, the Democratic Republic of the Congo and Ethiopia. It was described by Julius Weise in 1912.

References

Eumolpinae
Beetles of the Democratic Republic of the Congo
Insects of Rwanda
Insects of Ethiopia
Beetles described in 1912
Taxa named by Julius Weise